{{DISPLAYTITLE:Psi1 Piscium}}

Psi1 Piscium (Psi1 Psc, ψ1 Piscium, ψ1 Psc) is a binary star in the constellation Pisces. It is approximately 280 light years from Earth, based on its parallax.

The two components of Psi1 Piscium are both A-type main-sequence stars. The primary has an apparent magnitude of 5.273, while the secondary is slightly dimmer, with an apparent magnitude of 5.455. The primary itself is a close binary, with two A-type stars that orbit each other every 14.44 years.

Psi1 Piscium is moving through the Galaxy at a speed of 22.5 km/s relative to the Sun. Its projected Galactic orbit carries it between 22,800 and 24,300 light years from the center of the Galaxy.

Naming

References

Piscium, Psi1
Pisces (constellation)
A-type main-sequence stars
Piscium, 074
005131
Binary stars
0310
006456
Durchmusterung objects